Andrew Greene Carnell,  (April 10, 1877 – January 26, 1951) was a Canadian politician who served as mayor of  St. John's, Newfoundland.

Born in St. John's, Carnell received his early education at Bishop Feild College and the Methodist College before going into his father's business as an undertaker. He married Mabel Payne in 1904. They had two sons and four daughters. His son Geoffrey later served in the Newfoundland assembly.

After several failed attempts in colonial politics, he decided to enter municipal politics. In the municipal elections of 1929 for St. John's, he was elected deputy mayor. After the sitting mayor, Charles Howlett, died in 1932, Carnell became acting mayor until he was elected to the post officially by acclamation the following year. He was reelected to the position continuously until 1949. Carnell's term spanned the time under which Newfoundland was a Crown colony of the United Kingdom after the Dominion government had gone bankrupt and collapsed. To many Newfoundlanders, the mayor was the voice of the people as the highest-ranking official on the island that had been elected. To the colonial government, however, the city council was an inefficient nuisance. Nevertheless, Carnell was made a Commander of the Order of the British Empire in 1939.

Throughout his term, Carnell's administration continued to provide relatively stable and solvent government to St. John's, leading the way in debt relief, improving the standard and affordability of housing in the city and beginning construction on Memorial Stadium, which was finished in 1955. The 'LaGuardia of St. John's' was defeated by his deputy mayor, Harry Mews, in the 1949 election.

References

1877 births
1951 deaths
Mayors of St. John's, Newfoundland and Labrador
Bishop Feild School alumni
Canadian Commanders of the Order of the British Empire